Publius Manlius Capitolinus was a Roman statesman who served as Dictator in 368 BC.

Family
A member of the patrician gens Manlia, Capitolinus was the brother of Marcus Manlius Capitolinus, consul in 392 BC.

Career
In 368 BC, Capitolinus succeeded Marcus Furius Camillus as Dictator, who was forced to step down by the tribunes. Capitolinus successfully brokered a settlement between the plebeians and patricians. He appointed Gaius Licinius Stolo as Magister Equitum, the first plebeian to hold the office.

See also
Manlia (gens)

References

4th-century BC Romans
Ancient Roman dictators
Capitolinus, Publius Manlius
Year of birth unknown
Year of death unknown
Roman patricians